The 2016–17 Washington Capitals season was the 43rd season for the National Hockey League franchise that was established on June 11, 1974. They finished the season as presidents' Trophy winners for the second consecutive year, and third time in team history.

Standings

Schedule and results

Regular season

|- style="background:#ffc;"
| 1 || 13 || 7:00 pm || Washington Capitals || 2–3 SO || Pittsburgh Penguins || PPG Paints Arena (18,630) || 0–0–1 || 1
|- style="background:#cfc;"
| 2 || 15 || 7:00 pm || New York Islanders || 1–2 || Washington Capitals || Verizon Center (18,506) || 1–0–1 || 3
|- style="background:#cfc;"
| 3 || 18 || 7:00 pm || Colorado Avalanche || 0–3 || Washington Capitals || Verizon Center (18,506) || 2–0–1 || 5
|- style="background:#cfc;"
| 4 || 20 || 7:30 pm || Washington Capitals || 4–2 || Florida Panthers || BB&T Center (12,440) || 3–0–1 || 7
|- style="background:#fcc;"
| 5 || 22 || 7:00 pm || New York Rangers || 4–2 || Washington Capitals || Verizon Center (18,506) || 3–1–1 || 7
|- style="background:#fcc;"
| 6 || 26 || 9:30 pm || Washington Capitals || 1–4 || Edmonton Oilers || Rogers Place (18,347) || 3–2–1 || 7
|- style="background:#cfc;"
| 7 || 29 || 10:00 pm || Washington Capitals || 5–2 || Vancouver Canucks || Rogers Arena (18,338) || 4–2–1 || 9
|- style="background:#cfc;"
| 8 || 30 || 9:30 pm || Washington Capitals || 3–1 || Calgary Flames || Scotiabank Saddledome (18,454) || 5–2–1 || 11
|-

|- style="background:#cfc;"
| 9 || 1 || 8:00 pm || Washington Capitals || 3–2 || Winnipeg Jets || MTS Centre (15,294) || 6–2–1 || 13
|- style="background:#cfc;"
| 10 || 3 || 7:00 pm || Winnipeg Jets || 3–4 OT || Washington Capitals || Verizon Center (18,506) || 7–2–1 || 15
|- style="background:#cfc;"
| 11 || 5 || 7:00 pm || Florida Panthers || 2–4 || Washington Capitals || Verizon Center (18,506) || 8–2–1 || 17
|- style="background:#fcc;"
| 12 || 8 || 7:00 pm || San Jose Sharks || 3–0 || Washington Capitals || Verizon Center (18,506) || 8–3–1 || 17
|- style="background:#cfc;"
| 13 || 11 || 8:30 pm || Washington Capitals || 3–2 OT || Chicago Blackhawks || United Center (22,075) || 9–3–1 || 19
|- style="background:#fcc;"
| 14 || 12 || 7:00 pm || Washington Capitals || 1–5 || Carolina Hurricanes || PNC Arena (12,436) || 9–4–1 || 19
|- style="background:#ffc;"
| 15 || 15 || 7:00 pm || Washington Capitals || 1–2 OT || Columbus Blue Jackets || Nationwide Arena (11,738) || 9–4–2 || 20
|- style="background:#cfc;"
| 16 || 16 || 8:00 pm || Pittsburgh Penguins || 1–7 || Washington Capitals || Verizon Center (18,506) || 10–4–2 || 22
|- style="background:#cfc;"
| 17 || 18 || 7:00 pm || Detroit Red Wings || 0–1 || Washington Capitals || Verizon Center (18,506) || 11–4–2 || 24
|- style="background:#fcc;"
| 18 || 20 || 12:30 pm || Columbus Blue Jackets || 3–2 || Washington Capitals || Verizon Center (18,506) || 11–5–2 || 24
|- style="background:#cfc;"
| 19 || 23 || 7:00 pm || St. Louis Blues || 3–4 || Washington Capitals || Verizon Center (18,506) || 12–5–2 || 26
|- style="background:#cfc;"
| 20 || 25 || 5:00 pm || Buffalo Sabres || 1–3 || Washington Capitals || Verizon Center (18,506) || 13–5–2 || 28
|- style="background:#fcc;"
| 21 || 26 || 7:00 pm || Washington Capitals || 2–4 || Toronto Maple Leafs || Air Canada Centre (19,051) || 13–6–2 || 28
|-

|- style="background:#fcc;"
| 22 || 1 || 7:00 pm || New York Islanders || 3–0 || Washington Capitals || Verizon Center (18,506) || 13–7–2 || 28
|- style="background:#ffc;"
| 23 || 3 || 7:00 pm || Washington Capitals || 1–2 SO || Tampa Bay Lightning || Amalie Arena (19,092) || 13–7–3 || 29
|- style="background:#cfc;"
| 24 || 5 || 7:00 pm || Buffalo Sabres || 2–3 OT || Washington Capitals || Verizon Center (18,506) || 14–7–3 || 31
|- style="background:#cfc;"
| 25 || 7 || 8:00 pm || Boston Bruins || 3–4 OT || Washington Capitals || Verizon Center (18,506) || 15–7–3 || 33
|- style="background:#cfc;"
| 26 || 9 || 7:00 pm || Washington Capitals || 4–1 || Buffalo Sabres || First Niagara Center (18,234) || 16–7–3 || 35
|- style="background:#cfc;"
| 27 || 11 || 5:00 pm || Vancouver Canucks || 0–3 || Washington Capitals || Verizon Center (18,506) || 17–7–3 || 37
|- style="background:#cfc;"
| 28 || 13 || 7:00 pm || Washington Capitals || 4–2 || New York Islanders || Barclays Center (12,730) || 18–7–3 || 39
|- style="background:#cfc;"
| 29 || 16 || 7:30 pm || Washington Capitals || 4–3 SO || Carolina Hurricanes || PNC Arena (11,892) || 19–7–3 || 41
|- style="background:#fcc;"
| 30 || 17 || 7:00 pm || Montreal Canadiens || 2–1 || Washington Capitals || Verizon Center (18,506) || 19–8–3 || 41
|- style="background:#ffc;"
| 31 || 21 || 8:00 pm || Washington Capitals || 2–3 SO || Philadelphia Flyers || Wells Fargo Center (20,011) || 19–8–4 || 42
|- style="background:#cfc;"
| 32 || 23 || 7:00 pm || Tampa Bay Lightning || 0–4 || Washington Capitals || Verizon Center (18,506) || 20–8–4 || 44
|- style="background:#fcc;"
| 33 || 27 || 7:00 pm || Washington Capitals || 3–4 || New York Islanders || Barclays Center (15,795) || 20–9–4 || 44
|- style="background:#ffc;"
| 34 || 29 || 7:00 pm || New Jersey Devils || 2–1 SO || Washington Capitals || Verizon Center (18,506) || 20–9–5 || 45
|- style="background:#cfc;"
| 35 || 31 || 1:00 pm || Washington Capitals || 6–2 || New Jersey Devils || Prudential Center (16,514) || 21–9–5 || 47
|-

|- style="background:#cfc;"
| 36 || 1 || 7:30 pm || Ottawa Senators || 1–2 || Washington Capitals || Verizon Center (18,506) || 22–9–5 || 49
|- style="background:#cfc;"
| 37 || 3 || 7:00 pm || Toronto Maple Leafs || 5–6 OT || Washington Capitals || Verizon Center (18,506) || 23–9–5 || 51
|- style="background:#cfc;"
| 38 || 5 || 7:00 pm || Columbus Blue Jackets || 0–5 || Washington Capitals || Verizon Center (18,506) || 24–9–5 || 53
|- style="background:#cfc;"
| 39 || 7 || 7:00 pm || Washington Capitals || 1–0 || Ottawa Senators || Canadian Tire Centre (18,685) || 25–9–5 || 55
|- style="background:#cfc;"
| 40 || 9 || 7:30 pm || Washington Capitals || 4–1 || Montreal Canadiens || Bell Centre (21,288) || 26–9–5 || 57
|- style="background:#cfc;"
| 41 || 11 || 8:00 pm || Pittsburgh Penguins || 2–5 || Washington Capitals || Verizon Center (18,506) || 27–9–5 || 59
|- style="background:#cfc;"
| 42 || 13 || 7:00 pm || Chicago Blackhawks || 0–6 || Washington Capitals || Verizon Center (18,506) || 28–9–5 || 61
|- style="background:#cfc;"
| 43 || 15 || 12:30 pm || Philadelphia Flyers || 0–5 || Washington Capitals || Verizon Center (18,506) || 29–9–5 || 63
|- style="background:#ffc;"
| 44 || 16 || 7:00 pm || Washington Capitals || 7–8 OT || Pittsburgh Penguins || PPG Paints Arena (18,653) || 29–9–6 || 64
|- style="background:#cfc;"
| 45 || 19 || 8:00 pm || Washington Capitals || 7–3 || St. Louis Blues || Scottrade Center (19,316) || 30–9–6 || 66
|- style="background:#cfc;"
| 46 || 21 || 8:00 pm || Washington Capitals || 4–3 OT || Dallas Stars || American Airlines Center (18,532) || 31–9–6|| 68
|- style="background:#cfc;"
| 47 || 23 || 7:00 pm || Carolina Hurricanes || 1–6 || Washington Capitals || Verizon Center (18,506) || 32–9–6 || 70
|- style="background:#fcc;"
| 48 || 24 || 7:30 pm || Washington Capitals || 0–3 || Ottawa Senators || Canadian Tire Centre (16,683) || 32–10–6 || 70
|- style="background:#cfc;"
| 49 || 26 || 7:00 pm || Washington Capitals || 5–2 || New Jersey Devils || Prudential Center (13,428) || 33–10–6 || 72
|- style="background:#bbcaff;"
|colspan="3" | 27–29 ||colspan="10" | All-Star Break in Los Angeles
|- style="background:#fcc;"
| 50 || 31 || 7:00 pm || Washington Capitals || 2–3 || New York Islanders || Barclays Center (11,240) || 33–11–6 || 72
|-

|- style="background:#cfc;"
| 51 || 1 || 8:00 pm || Boston Bruins || 3–5 || Washington Capitals || Verizon Center (18,506) || 34–11–6 || 74
|- style="background:#cfc;"
| 52 || 4 || 1:00 pm || Washington Capitals || 3–2 || Montreal Canadiens || Bell Centre (21,288) || 35–11–6 || 76
|- style="background:#cfc;"
| 53 || 5 || 12:00 pm || Los Angeles Kings || 0–5 || Washington Capitals || Verizon Center (18,506) || 36–11–6 || 78
|- style="background:#cfc;"
| 54 || 7 || 7:00 pm || Carolina Hurricanes || 0–5 || Washington Capitals || Verizon Center (18,506) || 37–11–6 || 80
|- style="background:#cfc;"
| 55 || 9 || 7:00 pm || Detroit Red Wings || 3–6 || Washington Capitals || Verizon Center (18,506) || 38–11–6 || 82
|- style="background:#cfc;"
| 56 || 11 || 7:00 pm || Anaheim Ducks || 4–6 || Washington Capitals || Verizon Center (18,506) || 39–11–6 || 84
|- style="background:#ffc;"
| 57 || 18 || 2:00 pm || Washington Capitals || 2–3 SO || Detroit Red Wings || Joe Louis Arena (20,027) || 39–11–7 || 85
|- style="background:#fcc;"
| 58 || 19 || 12:30 pm || Washington Capitals || 1–2 || New York Rangers || Madison Square Garden (18,006) || 39–12–7 || 85
|- style="background:#cfc;"
| 59 || 22 || 8:00 pm || Washington Capitals || 4–1 || Philadelphia Flyers || Wells Fargo Center (19,849) || 40–12–7 || 87
|- style="background:#cfc;"
| 60 || 24 || 7:00 pm || Edmonton Oilers || 1–2 || Washington Capitals || Verizon Center (18,506) || 41–12–7 || 89
|- style="background:#fcc;"
| 61 || 25 || 5:00 pm || Washington Capitals || 2–5 || Nashville Predators || Bridgestone Arena (17,150) || 41–13–7 || 89
|- style="background:#cfc;"
| 62 || 28 || 7:00 pm || Washington Capitals || 4–1 || New York Rangers || Madison Square Garden (18,006) || 42–13–7 || 91
|-

|- style="background:#cfc;"
| 63 || 2 || 7:00 pm || New Jersey Devils || 0–1 || Washington Capitals || Verizon Center (18,506) || 43–13–7 || 93
|- style="background:#cfc;"
| 64 || 4 || 7:00 pm || Philadelphia Flyers || 1–2 OT || Washington Capitals || Verizon Center (18,506) || 44–13–7 || 95
|- style="background:#fcc;"
| 65 || 6 || 7:00 pm || Dallas Stars || 4–2 || Washington Capitals || Verizon Center (18,506) || 44–14–7 || 95
|- style="background:#fcc;"
| 66 || 9 || 10:30 pm || Washington Capitals || 2–4 || San Jose Sharks || SAP Center (17,562) || 44–15–7 || 95
|- style="background:#fcc;"
| 67 || 11 || 10:30 pm || Washington Capitals || 2–4 || Los Angeles Kings || Staples Center (18,230) || 44–16–7 || 95
|- style="background:#fcc;"
| 68 || 12 || 9:30 pm || Washington Capitals || 2–5 || Anaheim Ducks || Honda Center (17,174) || 44–17–7 || 95
|- style="background:#cfc;"
| 69 || 14 || 7:00 pm || Minnesota Wild || 2–4 || Washington Capitals || Verizon Center (18,506) || 45–17–7 || 97
|- style="background:#ffc;"
| 70 || 16 || 7:00 pm || Nashville Predators || 2–1 OT || Washington Capitals || Verizon Center (18,506) || 45–17–8 || 98
|- style="background:#cfc;"
| 71 || 18 || 7:00 pm || Washington Capitals || 5–3 || Tampa Bay Lightning || Amalie Arena (19,092) || 46–17–8 || 100
|- style="background:#cfc;"
| 72 || 21 || 7:00 pm || Calgary Flames || 2–4 || Washington Capitals || Verizon Center (18,506) || 47–17–8 || 102
|- style="background:#cfc;"
| 73 || 23 || 7:00 pm || Columbus Blue Jackets ||1–2 SO || Washington Capitals || Verizon Center (18,506) || 48–17–8 || 104
|- style="background:#cfc;"
| 74 || 25 || 7:00 pm || Arizona Coyotes || 1–4 || Washington Capitals || Verizon Center (18,506)|| 49–17–8 || 106
|- style="background:#cfc;"
| 75 || 28 || 8:00 pm || Washington Capitals || 5–4 OT || Minnesota Wild || Xcel Energy Center (19,188)|| 50–17–8 || 108
|- style="background:#cfc;"
| 76 || 29 || 10:00 pm || Washington Capitals || 5–3 || Colorado Avalanche || Pepsi Center (13,820)|| 51–17–8 || 110
|- style="background:#fcc;"
| 77 || 31 || 10:00 pm || Washington Capitals || 3–6 || Arizona Coyotes || Gila River Arena (14,290) || 51–18–8 || 110
|-

|- style="background:#cfc;"
| 78 || 2 || 6:00 pm || Washington Capitals || 3–2 || Columbus Blue Jackets || Nationwide Arena (18,247)|| 52–18–8 || 112
|- style="background:#cfc;"
| 79 || 4 || 7:30 pm || Washington Capitals || 4–1 || Toronto Maple Leafs || Air Canada Centre (19,415) || 53–18–8 || 114
|- style="background:#cfc;"
| 80 || 5 || 8:00 pm || New York Rangers || 0–2 || Washington Capitals || Verizon Center (18,506) || 54–18–8 || 116
|- style="background:#cfc;"
| 81 || 8 || 3:00 pm || Washington Capitals || 3–1 || Boston Bruins || TD Garden (17,565) || 55–18–8 || 118
|- style="background:#fcc;"
| 82 || 9 || 7:00 pm || Florida Panthers || 2–0 || Washington Capitals || Verizon Center (18,506) || 55–19–8 || 118
|-

|- style="text-align:center;"
| Legend:       = Win       = Loss       = OT/SO Loss

Playoffs

|- style="background:#cfc;"
| 1 || April 13 || Toronto Maple Leafs || 3–2 OT || Holtby || Washington leads 1–0
|- style="background:#fcc;"
| 2 || April 15 || Toronto Maple Leafs || 3–4 2OT || Holtby || Series tied 1–1
|- style="background:#fcc;"
| 3 || April 17 || @ Toronto Maple Leafs || 3–4 OT || Holtby || Toronto leads 2–1
|- style="background:#cfc;"
| 4 || April 19 || @ Toronto Maple Leafs || 5–4 || Holtby || Series tied 2–2
|- style="background:#cfc;"
| 5 || April 21 || Toronto Maple Leafs || 2–1 OT || Holtby || Washington leads 3–2
|- style="background:#cfc;"
| 6 || April 23 || @ Toronto Maple Leafs || 2–1 OT || Holtby || Washington won 4–2
|-

|- style="background:#fcc;"
| 1 || April 27 || Pittsburgh Penguins || 2–3 || Holtby || Pittsburgh leads 1–0
|- style="background:#fcc;"
| 2 || April 29 || Pittsburgh Penguins || 2–6 || Holtby || Pittsburgh leads 2–0
|- style="background:#cfc;"
| 3 || May 1 || @ Pittsburgh Penguins || 3–2 OT || Holtby || Pittsburgh leads 2–1
|- style="background:#fcc;"
| 4 || May 3 || @ Pittsburgh Penguins || 2–3 || Holtby || Pittsburgh leads 3–1
|- style="background:#cfc;"
| 5 || May 6 || Pittsburgh Penguins || 4–2 || Holtby || Pittsburgh leads 3–2
|- style="background:#cfc;"
| 6 || May 8 || @ Pittsburgh Penguins || 5–2 || Holtby || Series tied 3–3
|- style="background:#fcc;"
| 7 || May 10 || Pittsburgh Penguins || 0–2  || Holtby  || Pittsburgh won 4–3
|-

|-
|

Player statistics
Final Stats
Skaters

Goaltenders

†Denotes player spent time with another team before joining the Capitals. Stats reflect time with the Capitals only.
‡Denotes player was traded mid-season. Stats reflect time with the Capitals only.
Bold/italics denotes franchise record.

Transactions
The Capitals have been involved in the following transactions during the 2016–17 season.

Trades

Notes

Free agents acquired

Free agents lost

Claimed via waivers

Lost via waivers

Lost via retirement

Player signings

Draft picks

Below are the Washington Capitals' selections at the 2016 NHL Entry Draft, held June 24–25, 2016 at the First Niagara Center in Buffalo, New York.

Draft notes
 The Washington Capitals' first-round pick went to the St. Louis Blues as the result of a trade on June 24, 2016 that sent a first-round pick and Washington's third-round pick both in 2016 (28th and 87th overall) to Washington in exchange for this pick.
  The St. Louis Blues' first-round pick went to the Washington Capitals as the result of a trade on June 24, 2016 that sent a first-round pick in 2016 (26th overall) to St. Louis in exchange for Washington's third-round pick in 2016 (87th overall) and this pick.
 The Washington Capitals' second-round pick went to the Toronto Maple Leafs as the result of a trade on February 28, 2016 that sent Daniel Winnik and Anaheim's fifth-round pick in 2016 to Washington in exchange for Brooks Laich, Connor Carrick and this pick.
  The Washington Capitals' third-round pick was re-acquired as the result of a trade on June 24, 2016 that sent a first-round pick in 2016 (26th overall) to St. Louis in exchange for a first-round pick in 2016 (28th overall) and this pick.
St. Louis previously acquired this pick as the result of a trade on July 2, 2015 that sent T. J. Oshie to Washington in exchange for Troy Brouwer, Pheonix Copley and this pick.
  The Anaheim Ducks' fifth-round pick went to the Washington Capitals as the result of a trade on February 28, 2016 that sent Brooks Laich, Connor Carrick and a second-round pick in 2016 to Toronto in exchange for Daniel Winnik and this pick.
Toronto previously acquired this pick as the result of a trade on March 2, 2015 that sent Korbinian Holzer to Anaheim in exchange for Eric Brewer and this pick.

References

Washington Capitals seasons
Washington Capitals
Presidents' Trophy seasons
Washington Capitals
Washington Capitals